There were six special elections to the United States House of Representatives in 2017 during the 115th United States Congress.

All of the elections were won by the party previously holding the seat. Therefore, there were no net changes in party.

Although Democrats did not gain any seats, their margins were narrower than the districts' Cook Partisan Voting Index.

Elections are sorted by date and district.

Summary

Kansas's 4th congressional district

Montana's at-large congressional district

California's 34th congressional district

Georgia's 6th congressional district

South Carolina's 5th congressional district

Utah's 3rd congressional district

References 

 
2017